Malila: The Farewell Flower is a 2017 Thai drama film directed by Anucha Boonyawatana. The film premiered at Busan International Film Festival where it won Kim Jiseok Award. It was selected as the Thai entry for the Best Foreign Language Film at the 91st Academy Awards, but it was not nominated.

Cast
 Sukollawat Kanarot as Shane
 Sumret Muengput as Monk
 Anuchit Sapanpong as Pitch

Accolades

See also
 List of submissions to the 91st Academy Awards for Best Foreign Language Film
 List of Thai submissions for the Academy Award for Best Foreign Language Film

References

External links
 

2017 films
2017 drama films
2017 LGBT-related films
Thai LGBT-related films
Thai drama films
Thai-language films
Best Picture Suphannahong National Film Award winners